The Russian Men's Curling Cup is an annual national curling tournament for men's curling teams in Russia. It has been held annually since the 2007-08 season (usually in October, November or December), and is organized by the Russian Curling Federation. As of 2021, the event consisted of sixteen teams participating in a preliminary round robin and a single-knockout playoff.

Past champions
Teams line-up in order: fourth, third, second, lead, alternate(s), coach(es); skips marked bold.

References

External links
Russian Curling Federation
Curling in Russia (web archive)

See also
Russian Men's Curling Championship

 
Men's
Recurring sporting events established in 2007
2007 establishments in Russia
National curling cups